Recipe for Disaster  is a 1994 novel by Ugandan author Lillian Tindyebwa. The novel is used as a supplementary reader in secondary schools in Uganda.

Plot
Recipe for Disaster is a story about Hellen Ntale that follows the life choices she makes, how she gets expelled from St. Joseph's Girls School and how she leaves school three months to her high school final exams. She has a relationship with Kevin, a 42-year-old man, against her parents' approval. Hellen goes ahead to form other relationships with men outside her marriage. one of them being Kevin's partners son Trevor Kendall, a twenty five year old man nearly her age. after a fight on Christmas Eve with Kevin over his soon to be fourth wife Cindy, a student at the university, Kevin beat her up and Hellen decided to run to London where she intended to give Trevor a child in order to make Kevin jealous. However, once she has conceived, Trevor announced that he was engaged much to Hellen's surprise. She attempts to kill Trevor's fiancee, Diane. After an attempt to kill her, she ends up in the hospital and when she is released, Trevor and Diane are already married and long gone. She then decided to return home to Uganda where Kevin welcomes her with open arms. She then discovers Suzy has departed and is abroad. However during Hellen's absence, Kevin's first wife dies and soon after, Hellen gives birth upon laying eyes upon the child, Kevin is distressed to find its blond and demands to know the father. Discovering it is Trevor, he decides to kill Helen. However with the help of a nurse and bodyguard, Helen manages to escape and finds herself in one of the slums.  Kevin has been admitted into a hospital for mentally ill personnel. Helen is then discovered by her parents whom she is extremely ashamed and happy to see. She narrates her story to them before breathing her last.

References 

1994 novels
Ugandan novels
Postcolonial novels
Kumusha
1994 debut novels